The Singles, Volume III: 1964–1965 is the third compilation in a series of releases by Hip-O Select Records compiling the singles of James Brown. This compilation features all 7" single releases, including re-issues and canceled singles.

Track listing
Disc 1
"Please Please Please" (re-issue with audience overdub) – 2:43 – James Brown & the Famous Flames
"In The Wee Wee Hours (Of The Nite)" – 2:39 – James Brown & the Famous Flames
"Again" – 2:32 – James Brown & the Famous Flames
"How Long Darling" – 2:57 – James Brown & the Famous Flames
"Caldonia" – 2:41 – James Brown and his Orchestra
"Evil" – 2:50 – James Brown and his Orchestra
"The Things That I Used to Do" – 2:49 – James Brown and his Orchestra
"Out of the Blue" – 2:12 – James Brown and his Orchestra
"So Long" – 2:45 – James Brown & the Famous Flames
"Dancin Little Thing" – 2:04 – James Brown & the Famous Flames
"Soul Food Pt. 1" – 2:03 – Al Brisco Clark and his Orchestra 
"Soul Food Pt. 2" – 2:22 – Al Brisco Clark and his Orchestra
"Out of Sight" – 2:22 – James Brown and his Orchestra
"Maybe The Last Time" – 2:58 – James Brown and his Orchestra
"Tell Me What You're Gonna Do" – 2:10 – James Brown & the Famous Flames
"I Don't Care – 2:52" – James Brown & the Famous Flames
"Think" – 1:59 – James Brown & the Famous Flames
"Try Me" (re-issue with strings overdub) – 2:32 – James Brown & the Famous Flames

Disc 2	
"Have Mercy Baby" – 2:11 – James Brown & the Famous Flames
"Just Won't Do Right (I Stay in the Chapel Every Night)" – 2:41 – James Brown & the Famous Flames
"Fine Old Foxy Self" – 2:08 – James Brown & the Famous Flames
Medley: "I Found Someone/Why Do You Do Me Like You Do/I Want You So Bad" – 2:09 – James Brown & the Famous Flames
"This Old Heart" – 2:17 – James Brown & the Famous Flames
"It Was You" – 2:42 – James Brown & the Famous Flames
"Devil's Hideaway" – 2:44 – James Brown at the Organ and his Orchestra 
"Who's Afraid of Virginia Woolf?" – 2:43 – James Brown at the Organ and his Orchestra
"I Got You" (Original) – 2:27 – James Brown and his Orchestra
"Only You" – 2:51 – James Brown and his Orchestra
"Papa's Got A Brand New Bag (Part 1)" – 2:06 – James Brown & the Famous Flames
"Papa's Got A Brand New Bag (Part 2)" – 2:09 – James Brown & the Famous Flames
"Try Me" (Single Version) – 3:07 – James Brown at the Organ
"Papa's Got A Brand New Bag" – 2:39 – James Brown at the Organ
"I Got You (I Feel Good)" – 2:46 – James Brown & the Famous Flames
"I Can't Help It (I Just Do-Do-Do)" -2:32 – James Brown & the Famous Flames
"Lost Someone" – 2:42 – James Brown & the Famous Flames
"I'll Go Crazy" – 2:17 – James Brown & the Famous Flames

James Brown compilation albums
2007 compilation albums